Nancy-Université federated the three principal institutes of higher education of Nancy, in Lorraine, France before their merger into the University of Lorraine:
 Henri Poincaré University (UHP, also known as Nancy 1): natural sciences, wrapping several faculties and engineering schools
 École Supérieure des Sciences et Technologies de l'Ingénieur de Nancy: general engineering
 Telecom Nancy: Computer science and engineering
 Nancy 2 University: social sciences
 Institut national polytechnique de Lorraine (Lorraine INP): It federates 11 engineering schools. 

With over 50,000 students, Nancy has the fifth largest student population in France.

Libraries
Nancy-Université has several academic libraries. The academic library of Nancy 2 University, opened by French president Albert Lebrun, contains around 500 000 documents, among which at least 250 000 are books, in 35 locations.

History
The original University of Lorraine was founded in 1572 in the nearby city of Pont-à-Mousson by Charles III, duke of Lorraine, and Charles, Cardinal of Lorraine, and was then run by the Jesuits. The University was transferred to Nancy in 1768. The University of Nancy was closed by the revolutionaries in 1793, and reopened in 1864.

Notable personnel 
 François Gény (1861–1959), French professor and jurist who introduced notion of "free scientific research" in positive law.
 Laurent Schwartz (1915-2002) was a researcher and teacher at the university when he received the Fields Medal in 1950.
 Jean-Pierre Serre (1926-alive) was a "maître de conférences" (MCF) at the university when he received the Fields Medal in 1954.

See also
List of early modern universities in Europe
List of public universities in France by academy

External links
Nancy-Université official website
University of Nancy 1
University of Nancy 2
INPL

 
Universities and colleges in Nancy, France
1572 establishments in France
Educational institutions established in the 1570s
University of Lorraine